Michael Cory Davis is an American actor, filmmaker, and activist.

Early life and education 
Born in Brooklyn to Jamaican parents, Davis studied acting at Fiorello H. LaGuardia High School. Upon graduation, he landed a recurring role on All My Children.

Career 
He has starred in shows such as Criminal Minds: Beyond Borders, Animal Kingdom, NCIS: LA, The Mentalist, For Better or Worse,  and Anger Management with Charlie Sheen. He has also starred in six highly rated made for TV films for the SyFy Channel (Manticore, Raptor Island, Path of Destruction, Alien Siege, Alien Apocalypse, Cerberus) as well as Tyler Perry's For Colored Girls, opposite Thandiwe Newton.

Filmography

Film

Television

External links
 
 
Artists United For Social Justice- Founder
Trafficking Films Store 
ABC NEWS

Year of birth missing (living people)
Living people
American documentary filmmakers
American male television actors
People from Brooklyn
American people of Jamaican descent
Activists from New York (state)
Fiorello H. LaGuardia High School alumni